Ascend Music is an American music distribution agency. It is a subsidiary of Ascend Agency, an American public relations agency. It specializes in providing services to independent artists.

Ascend Music publishs and distributes music on various streaming platforms, including Spotify, Apple Music, Soundcloud, and Youtube.

Overview
Ascend Music was founded in January 2021 by Jonathan Jadali and Brauch Owens, the founders of Ascend Agency, the parent company of Ascend Music. The company is based in the United States. Ascend Music helps to publish and distribute music releases on various streaming platforms, including Spotify, Apple Music, Soundcloud, and Youtube.

In its first year, Ascend Music generated revenue of $2.5 million, which tripled in the second year, reaching $7.5 million. As of January 2023, the firm has catered to over 1,000 artists.

References

External links
Official website

Music companies of the United States